Li Yunfei (born June 11, 1979) is a Chinese former competitive figure skater. He is the 1998 World Junior bronze medalist, 1999 Winter Universiade champion, 2000 Finlandia Trophy silver medalist, and 2003 Chinese national silver medalist. He represented China at the 2002 Winter Olympics, finishing 20th, and at four senior ISU Championships, achieving his best result, 6th, at the 2001 Worlds.

Programs

Results
GP: Grand Prix

References

External links

 

1979 births
Chinese male single skaters
Olympic figure skaters of China
Figure skaters at the 2002 Winter Olympics
Living people
Figure skaters from Harbin
World Junior Figure Skating Championships medalists
Figure skaters at the 2003 Asian Winter Games
Universiade medalists in figure skating
Universiade gold medalists for China
Competitors at the 1999 Winter Universiade
Competitors at the 1997 Winter Universiade